Folk art in the United States developed in the late 18th and early 19th centuries after the Revolutionary War when settlers revived artistic traditions from their home countries. Folk art includes artworks created by and for a large majority of people. It is defined by artistic expressions in a practical medium that has a specific purpose or continues a certain tradition important to a community of people. It includes hand crafted items such as tools, furniture and carvings, and traditional mediums such as oil paintings and tapestries which often served dual purposes, such as for the protection of a surface.

Development and history 

In colonial America, folk art grew out of artisanal craftsmanship in communities that allowed commonly trained people to individually express themselves, distinct from the high art tradition that dominated Europe, which was less accessible and generally less relevant to American settlers. The movements in art and craftsmanship in colonial America generally lagged behind that of Western Europe, with the prevailing mediaeval style of woodwork and primitive sculpture becoming integral to early American folk art, despite the emergence of renaissance styles in the late 16th and early 17th centuries in England. This would have been early enough to have a considerable impact on American folk art styles if it were not for the already adopted forms. As styles slowly changed, there was a tendency for rural artisans to continue the preexisting style longer than their urban counterparts, and far longer than those from Western Europe.

Surviving examples from as early as the beginning of the 17th century showcase a mixture of mediums and art styles, with portraits being painted in the New England area as early as the 1640’s. The prevalence and variety of folk art mediums and styles is due, in part, to social values in early colonial America that viewed the colonies as somehow inferior to the ruling European nations. Much of the fine art from the period focused on European scenes and values, leaving the expression of life in the colonies to folk art.

Communities with strong religious practices such as the Puritans and Quakers at times rejected the practice of art as being worldly and indulgent, leading to less ornate artworks, and fewer with any kind of prioritised purpose of personal expression. Despite this, many members of these communities still engaged in artistic expression often for religious reasons, or dealing with religious subject matter. A prominent example of such an individual was the painter Edward Hicks, a Quaker from the New England area who lived from 1780 to 1849.

Challenges 
Due to the often multiple practical uses of folk art artefacts from the colonial and antebellum periods in America, many pieces of art go anonymous and unconnected to any specific artists. Although there are many prominent and well known American folk artists, there are many more who are lacking in biographical details or cannot have anonymous creations attributed to them, posing a challenge to the study of folk art.

Style

Portraiture 

The style of American folk art varied across different regions due to the diversity of immigrants. However, there is some influence of academic conventions in the composition, setting and poses of the portraits. There were two types of settings for portraits: a solid, monotone backdrop or the homes of the sitters often surrounded by objects that conveyed their personality, status or gender. The portraits are restrained in all aspects as they are characterised by a flattened perspective with generalised lighting which created little to none tonal shading. As artists distorted scale and depth, they confined their sitters to a narrow dimension of space between the picture plane and the background behind them to allow for a shorter depth of field. There is an overall flatness and linearity to the paintings due to the flat, delicate application of paint across the entire artwork. The artworks are carefully composed with clear spatial arrangements for each figure within the work as the sitters are either posted in full profile, looking straight at the viewer or slightly turned to one side. Folk art portraits were either bust portraits from the chest upwards or full body portraits with static poses as artists often relied on compositional formulas for the face and hands which provided a resemblance to all the sitters which allowed artists to work quickly with limited materials and time. This resulted in the lack of emotion depicted through the stern expressions, direct gazes and tight pursed lips. Motifs and objects were used instead as an identifying mark for the patrons with books and eventually newspapers were a common traditional motif in male portraits, while female portraits contained symbols of femininity and domesticity such as fruits, flowers, animals or handheld fans. The texture and patterns of the sitters' clothes, furniture or carpets allowed artists to enliven the already sombre portraits and evoke the personality of the sitters.

Fraktur art 

Fraktur art was a decorative element for documents such as poems, religious texts, particularly birth and baptismal certificates, and furniture. Artists typically used a goose quill as a primary tool to outline and draw onto their mediums while using a brush made from cat hair to put the colours down. Fraktur art is closely related to calligraphy, not only in the similar use of tools but also in the dependence on the line to create dimension and shape within the artworks. All the elements within the artwork are outlined with a black calligraphic line to enhance the dimensionality of the element by providing layered details onto the flat colours laid down, while also contrasting it against the often pale background and monochromatic text. However, the lack of expressive brushwork, texture and shading resulted in an overall flatness by enhancing the two dimensionality of the artworks. The main subject matter of these fraktur artworks often consisted of birds, animals and flower motifs within a floral arrangement that encircled the text as a border.

Artists 
Most American folk artists were self taught, and worked as portrait makers to generate income. An example of this can be seen by Rufus Hathaway (1770-1822) who worked as a self taught portrait painter for five years. The nature of American folk art not relying on a traditional education in the arts meant there was a greater range of backgrounds among the artists that produced pieces of art in this movement. This means that there were many variations in the appearance of folk art. Although there were similar motifs and techniques across artworks, this variation made certain artists' pieces more difficult to identify or to categorise. For example, the variation in Ammi Phillips' (1788-1865) artworks once led art historians to believe his pieces were produced by several people.

The artists operating within this style tended to also rely on another profession to make a sufficient living. Some artists had to stop producing pieces in a professional capacity due to a lack of income. Artists with dual professions would draw from their experiences from their secondary profession to inform their method of art creation. Artists such as Edward Hicks (1780-1849)  and Sheldon Peck (1797-1868) both had to find another source of income to support their art career, the latter becoming a farmer and the former working as a preacher. Rufus Hathaway would also stop producing art as a career by switching professions to a doctor. Following his death, his eulogy would mention how a lack of income played a part in informing his decision to stop creating art. Artists such as Ammi Phillips were the outliers in this regard; he would maintain art as his only profession the entire time he produced pieces professionally.

Of the better recognised artists, most of them worked in cities producing portraits for the inhabitants. Some travelled to other cities or states to continue their work once a population's demand for portraits reduced, such as Sheldon Peck and Ammi Phillips who both left their homes to continue producing art pieces.

Quaker artists who participated within this art style generally did not produce religious pieces, as English protestantism opposed the creation of religious art. Edward Hicks did not subscribe to this belief, as he begun making pieces that he believed would spread the gospel. He was therefore able to merge careers and be both a preacher and artist simultaneously.

Better known artists were usually born into families who had experience within artisan or craft industries. Several would be born into families that had local political influence or enjoyed a higher standard of living due to a high demand for their services. The artist Edward Hicks was born into a family that had been loyal to the English Monarchy during the revolutionary war due to his role in local governance. There is thus some evidence to suggest that prominent folk-artists were of higher social standings, but artists generally came from a wide range of socio-economic backgrounds.

Women folk artists 
Without formal academic training as a prerequisite to a folk artist’s success, the art form gained popularity among those who were often denied such training, including women. Although the schooling of women in 18-19th century America was widespread in areas such as New England, the curriculum remained limited. The principal scope of sending young girls to school was to enhance their religious astuteness and knowledge of biblical texts. As such, the majority of scholastic projects undertaken by female students involved the deciphering of texts, but not the creation of their own. In fact, despite being able to read, most women could not write. Other similar creative and expressive pursuits were discouraged in academic settings, meaning women artists were often self-taught.

Once women completed their studies, marriage and subjugation to the domestic sphere was customary. Wives would often engage in small-scale production of textiles for commercial sale and domestic use. This allowed them to cultivate the artistic skills and craftsmanship both required to satisfy their role in society (clothing the children, making bedsheets, decorating the home) and to create art. Embroidery was thus a commonly employed medium of folk-art pieces made by women artists such as Sarah Ann Garges (c. 1834–c. 1887). Her piece, “Appliqué Bedcover (1853),” features pastoral motifs which represent her rural upbringing in Pennsylvania.
 
The appliance of practical skills associated with 19th century womanhood to the creation of folk-art is also evident in the widespread use of wool thread. For example, in her work “Adam and Eve (1835)”, Helen Shaw uses wool thread on wool ground to portray the biblical story. As critical acclaim was not often afforded to women artists, many of their artworks were made as gifts for family and friends, such as Shaw’s textile art.
 
As most women were confined to using techniques and tools that were culturally acceptable such as needle and thread, entering male dominated mediums such as easel painting could be difficult. Those women who were successful in doing so were usually from wealthier backgrounds and could therefore receive professional schooling in visual arts. Middle and upper-class women did not need to rely on domestically available mediums such as stitching and embroidery and instead experimented with high quality art materials which granted them greater validity as artists. One of the more prominent woman folk artists of 18-19th century America is Eunice Pinney. She used watercolours to paint genre scenes and mourning pictures, mainly featuring upper-class people and settings. Her and her contemporary Mary Ann Wilson are considered some of the first Americans to use the medium of watercolour.
 
Ruth Henshaw Bascom (1772-1884) was another established female folk artist. Her compositions are almost exclusively portraits, of which she produced over 1,400. Portraiture became popular among women artists who would often use children and relatives in the home as models. Their art thus emphasised community and family involvement. Other prominent women folk artists of the 18-19th century who specialised in portraiture include Susan Waters and Emily Eastman.

References

American art movements
Arts in the United States
Folk art